Enawene Nawe (Enawené-Nawé, Enawenê-Nawê, Eneuene-Mare), also known as , is an Arawakan language of Brazil spoken by about 570 people living in the Juruena River basin area, and more specifically along the Iquê river in the state of Mato Grosso.

Classification 

Aikhenvald (1999) classifies Enawene Nawe as a South Arawak language together with Terena, Lapachu and Moxo. However, more recent works by both Fabre (2005) and Brandão & Facundes (2007) consider the language to form a subgroup with Paresi in the Paresi–Xingu branch of Arawakan languages.

Phonology

Consonants 

Enawene Nawe is described by Zorthêa (2006) as having 15 contrastive consonants.

Among these, the following allophonic variations are reported:

Vowels 

Enawene Nawe is described by Zorthêa (2006) as having 4 oral vowels and 4 nasal vowels.

Grammar

Pronouns

Numerals 
The first eleven numbers in Enawene Nawe are as follows:

Zorthêa (2006) notes that all numbers except initini (2) and monarese (5) can be preceded and followed by affixes.

Affixes 
Enawene Nawe makes use of a variety of suffixes and prefixes to derive different meanings from root words.

Gender suffixes 
Zorthêa (2006) describes Enawene Nawe as having two suffixes to explicitly mark gender: -lo for the feminine gender and -re for the masculine. De Almeida (2015), however, notes four suffixes: -nero and -lo mark the feminine gender, while -nere and -li mark the masculine.

Examples from de Almeida (2015):

 Towalinero "a Towali woman"
 Towalinere "a Towali man"
 Iyakaloti  "a female spirit"
 Iyakaliti  "a male spirit"

Place suffix 
The suffix -kwa is used to mark places and is commonly found in village names. For example, the name of the Enawene Nawe village Matokodakwa is ultimately derived from matokoda, meaning "container for transporting liquids", and -kwa "place".

References 

Arawakan languages
Languages of Brazil
Mamoré–Guaporé linguistic area